Forastera is a white Spanish wine grape variety that is primarily grown in the Canary Islands. While it may have historically been used in sack production, now it is mostly a minor blending grape permitted in the Denominaciones de Origens (DOs) of the Canary Islands.

Relationship to other grapes
In the early 21st century, DNA analysis confirmed that the Forastera grape of the Canary Islands was a completely different and distinct variety with no close genetic relationship to the Italian Forastera grape growing on the islands of Ischia and Procida off the coast of Naples in Campania.

References

Spanish wine
Grape varieties of Spain
White wine grape varieties